= New World Oil and Gas =

Eridge Capital Limited
- Formerly: New World Oil and Gas plc
- Type: Public limited company
- Industry: Oil and gas exploration
- Founded: April 15, 2010
- Fate: Renamed and restructured
- Headquarters: Formerly Jersey; now registered in the British Virgin Islands
- Products: Oil and gas exploration projects

New World Oil and Gas plc (now Eridge Capital Limited and registered in the British Virgin Islands) was once a Jersey-based oil and gas exploration company that was listed on London's Alternative Investment Market. The company had projects in Belize and Denmark. The company was incorporated on 15 April 2010.

In 2015, Christopher Williams, a private investor, accidentally purchased 48.7% of the company in the name of his 76-year-old mother Judith, a bed and breakfast owner, instead of the 10% he intended to buy. The city takeovers panel warned that Mrs Williams might be required under city rules to make a takeover offer for the whole company as her holding exceeded 30%, leading to efforts by Mrs Williams' advisers to reduce the holding below that level. On 29 April 2015, the company announced that it would seek approval at an emergency general meeting to increase the number of shares in issue by over 300% straight after this announcement and before the shares had been approved by the current shareholders. The new shares flooded the market. The issue of selling shares which have not been officially approved has been a practice on the London AIM for a number of years. It is a type of share shorting, with the short being closed when the new shares are officially issued. New World Oil, became infamous when the private investors under the banner of nwogaction voted against the issue of the new shares. This caused one the largest short squeezes in the history of the LSE AIM index. This was considered a rare situation where the power of the shareholders proved stronger than the New World Oil and Gas Board of Directors, Nominated Adviser (Beaumont Cornish) and Broker (Cornhill Capital).
